This is a list of British television related events from 1980.

Events

January
1 January – The sitcom, Hi-de-Hi!, set in a holiday camp in 1959/60 makes its debut on BBC1.
6 January – Debut of the game show Family Fortunes on ITV, presented by Bob Monkhouse. 
20 January – The largest ever British TV audience for a film is recorded when some 23,500,000 viewers tune in for the ITV showing of the James Bond film Live and Let Die, released in 1973 and starring Roger Moore, making his debut as Ian Fleming's secret agent 007.
24 January – The Independent Broadcasting Authority announces that in the next ITV franchising round it will offer a national licence for breakfast television on ITV.
26 January – ITV show the feature length pilot episode of Hart to Hart, starring Robert Wagner and Stefanie Powers.
28 January – The first edition of Newsnight is broadcast on BBC2. Its launch has been delayed for four months by the Association of Broadcasting Staff, at this time the main BBC trade union.

February
1 February – Debut of the game show Play Your Cards Right on ITV, presented by Bruce Forsyth.
10 February – London Weekend Television launches Gay Life, a late night regional series for gay viewers airing on Sundays. It is the first UK television series specifically aimed at a gay audience and is aired for two series in 1980 and 1981. 
19 February – Debut of the Scottish Television produced soap opera Take the High Road on ITV. 
25 February – The political sitcom Yes Minister makes its debut on BBC2 with the episode Open Government.

March
12 March – The very first in-vision Ceefax transmissions is broadcast on BBC1 between 8:30am and 9am. In-vision teletext broadcasts on BBC2 start shortly after, airing between 10 and 10:30am and 3:30 and 4pm although if BBC2 were to be transmitting programmes at these times, the channel would broadcast Ceefax pages for the 30 minutes prior to the start of the first programme. These broadcasts are shown only on weekdays.

April
2 April – Violet Carson makes her last appearance as Ena Sharples on Coronation Street.
8 April – Decided by the IBA, weekly episodes of Crossroads are now reduced from four to three, Tuesday to Thursdays. Starting from that day, ATV had planned to replace the fourth episode with a spin-off series called A Family Affair but the idea was dropped.
9 April – ITV airs the critically acclaimed Death of a Princess, a drama documentary about a young princess from a fictitious Middle-Eastern Islamic nation and her lover who are publicly executed for adultery. The drama is believed to be based on the true story of Princess Misha'al bint Fahd al Saud and its showing causes a great deal of controversy, provoking an angry response from the Government of Saudi Arabia. 
12 April – The comedy sketch show Russ Abbot's Madhouse makes its debut on ITV.
26 April – The Dallas spin-off series Knots Landing makes its debut on BBC1. It is shown on the same time slot where Dallas itself had been shown.
28 April – Thames launches its long-awaited late night Thames News bulletin to follow News at Ten, the launch having been postponed from September 1978 due to union problems.

May
5 May – Both the BBC and ITV interrupt their scheduled programming to live broadcast footage of the SAS assault which ends the Iranian Embassy siege in London. The coverage launches the careers of several journalists such as the BBC's Kate Adie, while ITN Director, David Goldsmith and his team receive a BAFTA for their coverage.
22 May – Blue Peter interviews two of the stars of The Empire Strikes Back, Mark Hamill and Carrie Fisher. Hamill goes on to name the next Star Wars movie (Revenge of the Jedi) as well as an accurate prediction on the eventual prequels almost two decades later.
24 May – The fantasy game show The Adventure Game makes its debut on BBC1.
26 May – BBC1 airs the third-season finale of the US drama series Dallas two months after its US airing in which J. R. Ewing is shot by an unknown assailant in his office; this leads to the Who shot J.R.? phenomenon which lasts until November 1980 when the series returns for the fourth season.

June
23 June – ITV airs the 2000th episode of Coronation Street.

July
19 July–3 August – The BBC and ITV provide live coverage of the 1980 Summer Olympics from Moscow.

August
30 August – The science-fiction series Buck Rogers in the 25th Century makes its debut on ITV.

September
4 September – The US science-fiction series Battlestar Galactica makes its debut on ITV. 
6 September 
BBC2 launches a computer generated clock, probably the first in the world, although ATV has an electronic digital timepiece by this time, the digits are electronically superimposed onto a physical "ATV – COLOUR" caption.
The family comedy series Metal Mickey makes its debut on ITV in which a five foot silver robot becomes the member of a household. The show attracts an audience of 12 million viewers.    
8 September – Watchdog is launched as a weekly consumer slot on BBC1's news magazine programme Nationwide. It becomes a series in its own right in 1985.
13 September – ITV begin showing the Hammer Films produced supernatural series Hammer House of Horror.
17 September – The government reverses its position on the establishment of a separate Welsh language television service for Wales following opposition from the public and Welsh politicians and the idea is given the green light. This leads to the establishment of the Welsh Fourth Channel Authority and ultimately S4C.
September – Edmund Dell is appointed as the Chairman of Channel 4, the UK's forthcoming fourth channel while Jeremy Isaacs becomes its Chief Executive.

October
1 October – BBC1's lunchtime children's block is now called See Saw.
2 October – Thames airs a 10-hour Telethon to raise money for good causes in the London area.

November
9 November – BBC1 starts airing season 4 of the US drama series Dallas .
13 November 
The Broadcasting Act 1980 paves the way for a fourth UK television service,  leading to creation of Channel 4 and S4C in Wales, beginning transmission in 1982, the IBA begins the process of creating Channel 4 as a subsidiary, a subscription will be levied on the ITV companies to pay for the channel, they will sell Channel 4's airtime in return.
The Times reports that News International has sold its remaining 25% stake in London Weekend Television, bringing an end to LWT's connection with Australian businessman Rupert Murdoch.
21 November 
The first annual Children in Need charity appeal is broadcast on BBC1. Although it did not broadcast the full evening until 1984, it was a series of short segments linking the evening's programmes. 
22 November 
21.5 million viewers tune in to watch the episode of Dallas which answers the question of Who shot J.R.? less than 18 hours after its showing in the United States, At this time the audience figures are a record for a soap in Britain.
24 November – The US sitcom Diff'rent Strokes makes its UK debut on ITV, starring Gary Coleman with his catchphrase "What'chu talkin' 'bout, Willis?"

December
1 December – BBC Scotland carries out a one-week experiment in breakfast television. It is a simulcast of BBC Radio Scotland's breakfast show Good Morning Scotland.
6 December – ITV screen the 1976 Richard Lester directed romantic drama film Robin and Marian, starring Sean Connery and Audrey Hepburn.
8 December – Ian Allen's puppet series for children called Button Moon makes its debut on ITV with narration by actor Robin Parkinson ('Allo 'Allo!) and a theme tune sung by husband and wife stars Peter Davison (Doctor Who) and Sandra Dickinson (The Hitchhiker's Guide to the Galaxy, The Amazing World of Gumball and The Tomorrow People).
9 December 
The single drama The Flipside of Dominick Hide is first broadcast as part of the Play for Today series on BBC1.
20th anniversary of the first episode of Coronation Street.
23 December – The US animated special Rudolph the Red-Nosed Reindeer airs for the last time on ITV until it is shown again on 26 December 2020 (Boxing Day). 
25 December – The network television premiere of the 1974 James Bond film The Man with the Golden Gun on ITV, starring Roger Moore.
26 December – BBC1 screen the network television premiere of the 1975 disaster film The Towering Inferno, starring Paul Newman and Steve McQueen. 
28 December – The IBA announces the results of the 1980 franchise round. TSW will replace Westward and TVS will replace Southern. ATV must restructure the company to create a separate East and West Midlands service and reduce the shareholding of its parent body to 51% by February 1981. Also announced is the winner of a national franchise to provide a breakfast television service on ITV. TV-am is awarded the contract to begin transmission in 1983.
30 December – The BBC announces their intention to launch their own breakfast television service to compete with TV-am which was announced two days earlier. Breakfast Time is launched on BBC1 on 17 January 1983, two weeks before TV-am.

Unknown
BBC Video is established as a division of BBC Enterprises.

Debuts

BBC1
1 January
Hi-de-Hi! (1980–1988)
The Adventures of Tom Sawyer (1980)
2 January – Our John Willie (1980)
4 January – The Assassination Run (1980)
8 January – Flesh and Blood (1980–1982)
13 January – Spy! (1980) 
17 January – Watch This Space (1980)
25 January – Francis Durbridge Presents: Breakaway (1980)
6 February – God's Wonderful Railway (1980)
28 February – Sweet Nothings (1980)
1 March – Holocaust (1978)
2 March – The History of Mr Polly (1980)
18 March – Time of My Life (1980)
13 April – The Swish of the Curtain (1980)
25 April – The Sun Trap (1980)
26 April – Knots Landing (1979–1993)
27 April – Buccaneer (1980)
29 April – Hannah (1980)
11 May – Doom Castle (1980)
24 May – The Adventure Game (1980–1986)
1 June – Coming Home (1980)
12 June – Square Mile of Murder (1980)
6 August – Golden Soak (1980)
30 August – Juliet Bravo (1980–1985)
3 September – Oh Happy Band! (1980)
4 September – Mackenzie (1980)
8 September – Watchdog (1980–present)
13 September – Romie-0 and Julie-8 (1979)
1 October – King Rollo (1980)
5 October – A Tale of Two Cities (1980)
13 October – The Amazing Adventures of Morph (1980–1981)
14 October – Forgive Our Foolish Ways (1980)
15 October 
 Stone (1980)
 Nice Work (1980)
17 October – To Serve Them All My Days (1980–1981)
11 November – The Waterfall (1980)
19 November – A Little Silver Trumpet (1980)
21 November – Children in Need (1980–present)
30 November – The Talisman (1980)
4 December – Sink or Swim (1980–1982)
9 December – The Flipside of Dominick Hide (1980)
23 December – The Bells of Astercote (1980)
29 December – The Devil and Daniel Mouse (1978)

BBC2
7 January – Training Dogs the Woodhouse Way (1980)
8 January – Company and Co (1980)
13 January – Pride and Prejudice (1980)
30 January – Newsnight (1980–present)
25 February – Yes Minister (1980–1984 1986–1988 as Yes, Prime Minister)
12 March – Therese Raquin (1980)
25 March – A Question of Guilt (1980) 
15 April – The Enigma Files (1980)
7 May – 'Tis Pity She's a Whore (1980)
1 September – Wainwright's Law (1980)
10 September – We, the Accused (1980)
12 September – Escape (1980)
29 October – Oppenheimer (1980)
30 October – Great Railway Journeys of the World (1980; 1994)
1 November – Did You See...? (1980–1993)
20 November – Dr. Jekyll and Mr. Hyde (1980)
2 December – Ireland: A Television History (1980–1981)
28 December – Maria Marten or Murder in the Red Barn (1980)

ITV
6 January 
 Shillingbury Tales (1980–1981) 
 Family Fortunes (1980–1985, 1987–2002, 2006–2015, 2020–present)
7 January – Keep It in the Family (1980–1983)
8 January – Hollywood (1980)
24 January – Together (1980–1981)
26 January – Hart to Hart (1979-1984)
27 January 
 Pig in the Middle (1980–1983)
 The Spoils of War (1980–1981)
1 February – Play Your Cards Right (1980–1987, 1994–1999, 2002–2003)
11 February – Jukes of Piccadilly (1980)
18 February – Rushton's Illustrated (1980)
19 February 
 Take the High Road (1980–2003)
 The Hard Way (1980)
2 March – The Further Adventures of Oliver Twist (1980)
10 March – Fox (1980)
12 March – The Setbacks (1980–1986)
22 March – Bloody Kids (1980)
30 March – Why Didn't They Ask Evans? (1980)
2 April – Noah's Castle (1980)
9 April – Death of a Princess (1980)
11 April – The Gentle Touch (1980–1984)
12 April – Russ Abbot's Madhouse (1980–1985)
13 April – Cribb (1980–1981) 
14 April – Young at Heart (1980–1982)
17 April – The Nesbitts Are Coming (1980)
1 May – For Maddie with Love (1980–1981) 
6 May – Cockleshell Bay (1980–1986)
30 May – The Other 'Arf (1980–1986)
2 June 
The Latchkey Children (1980)
Can We Get on Now, Please? (1980)
25 June – Maggie's Moor  (1980)
2 July – Sounding Brass (1980)
14 July – Grundy (1980)
20 July – Lady Killers (1980–1981) 
10 August – Watch All Night (1980)
12 August – The Square Leopard (1980)
30 August – Buck Rogers in the 25th Century (1979–1982)
1 September – Just Liz (1980)
2 September 
 Arthur C. Clarke's Mysterious World (1980)
 Cooper's Half Hour  (1980)
3 September – Cowboys (1980–1981) 
4 September – Battlestar Galactica (1978–1979)
5 September – Holding the Fort (1980–1982) 
6 September – Metal Mickey (1980–1983)
13 September – Hammer House of Horror (1980)
17 September – Flickers (1980)
24 September – Munch Bunch (1980–1982)
28 September – Nobody's Perfect  (1980–1982)
1 October – The Squad (1980)
19 October – Blade on the Feather (1980)
23 October – The Glamour Girls (1980)
24 October – Fancy Wanders (1980)
26 October – Rain on the Roof (1980)
29 October – Love in a Cold Climate (1980)
2 November – Cream in My Coffee (1980)
14 November –  The Good Companions (1980)
24 November – Diff'rent Strokes (1978–1986)
8 December – Button Moon (1980–1988)
16 December – An Audience with... (1980–2013)
17 December – Secombe with Music (1980–1982)
25 December – Janet and Company (1980–1982)
28 December 
 Drake's Venture (1980)
 Staying On (1980)
30 December – Take a Chance (1980–1981)
31 December – Brendon Chase (1980–1981) 
Unknown – Aubrey (1980)

Continuing television shows

1920s
BBC Wimbledon (1927–1939, 1946–2019, 2021–present)

1930s
The Boat Race (1938–1939, 1946–2019)
BBC Cricket (1939, 1946–1999, 2020–2024)

1940s
Come Dancing (1949–1998)

1950s
The Good Old Days (1953–1983)
Panorama (1953–present)
Crackerjack (1955–1984, 2020–present)
What the Papers Say (1956–2008)
The Sky at Night (1957–present)
Blue Peter (1958–present)
Grandstand (1958–2007)

1960s
Coronation Street (1960–present)
Songs of Praise (1961–present)
Animal Magic (1962–1983)
Doctor Who (1963–1989, 2005–present)
World in Action (1963–1998)
Top of the Pops (1964–2006)
Match of the Day (1964–present)
Crossroads (1964–1988, 2001–2003)
Play School (1964–1988)
Mr. and Mrs. (1965–1999)
World of Sport (1965–1985)
Jackanory (1965–1996, 2006)
Sportsnight (1965–1997) 
Call My Bluff (1965–2005)
It's a Knockout (1966–1982, 1999–2001)
The Money Programme (1966–2010)
ITV Playhouse (1967–1982)
The Big Match (1968–2002)
Nationwide (1969–1983)
Screen Test (1969–1984)

1970s
The Goodies (1970–1982)
The Old Grey Whistle Test (1971–1987)
The Two Ronnies (1971–1987, 1991, 1996, 2005)
Clapperboard (1972–1982)
Crown Court (1972–1984)
Pebble Mill at One (1972–1986)
Rainbow (1972–1992, 1994–1997)
Emmerdale (1972–present)
Newsround (1972–present)
Weekend World (1972–1988)
Pipkins (1973–1981)
We Are the Champions (1973–1987)
Last of the Summer Wine (1973–2010)
That's Life! (1973–1994)
It Ain't Half Hot Mum (1974–1981)
Tiswas (1974–1982)
Wish You Were Here...? (1974–2003)
Arena (1975–present)
Jim'll Fix It (1975–1994)
The Muppet Show (1976–1981)
When the Boat Comes In (1976–1981)
Multi-Coloured Swap Shop (1976–1982)
Rentaghost (1976–1984)
One Man and His Dog (1976–present)
Robin's Nest (1977–1981)
You're Only Young Twice (1977–1981)
The Professionals (1977–1983)
Blake's 7 (1978–1981)
Ski Sunday (1978–present)
Strangers (1978–1982)
Butterflies (1978–1983, 2000)
3-2-1 (1978–1988)
Grange Hill (1978–2008)
Agony (1979–1981)
Something Else (1979–1981)
To the Manor Born (1979–1981, 2007)
Worzel Gummidge (1979–1981)
Dick Turpin (1979–1982)
Friday Night, Saturday Morning (1979–1982)
Not the Nine O'Clock News (1979–1982)
Only When I Laugh (1979–1982)
Sapphire & Steel (1979–1982)
Terry and June (1979–1987)
The Book Tower (1979–1989)
Blankety Blank (1979–1990, 1997–2002)
The Paul Daniels Magic Show (1979–1994)
Antiques Roadshow (1979–present)
Question Time (1979–present)

Ending this year
 6 June – Magpie (1968–1980)
 7 August – The Cuckoo Waltz (1975–1980)
 26 October – The Onedin Line (1971–1980)
 21 December – Shoestring (1979–1980)
 25 December – Thunderbirds (1972–1980, 1984–1987)
 31 December – Citizen Smith (1977–1980)Tom Sawyer (1980)

Births
 29 February — George Young, actor
 24 March — Amanda Davies, BBC sportscaster
 8 April – Ben Freeman, actor
 30 April – Sam Heughan, actor
 22 May – Lucy Gordon, actress and model (died 2009)
 1 June – Oliver James, actor
 4 June – Philip Olivier, actor
 22 June – Charlene White, television presenter and newsreader 
 17 July – Brett Goldstein, actor and comedian
 18 July – Tasmin Lucia-Khan, journalist and news presenter
 23 August – Joanne Froggatt, actress
 1 September – Lara Pulver, actress
 6 September – Kerry Katona, television presenter, actress and singer
 19 November – Adele Silva, actress
 5 December – Cherry Healey, television presenter
 25 December – Laura Sadler, television actress (died 2003)

Deaths

See also
 1980 in British music
 1980 in British radio
 1980 in the United Kingdom
 List of British films of 1980

References